Gino Sopracordevole (24 September 1904 – 1995) was an Italian rowing coxswain who competed in the 1924 Summer Olympics. Sopracordevole was born in Venice in 1904. In 1924 he won the silver medal as coxswain of the Italian boat in the coxed pair event.

References

External links
 profile

1904 births
1995 deaths
Sportspeople from Venice
Italian male rowers
Coxswains (rowing)
Olympic rowers of Italy
Rowers at the 1924 Summer Olympics
Olympic silver medalists for Italy
Olympic medalists in rowing
Medalists at the 1924 Summer Olympics
European Rowing Championships medalists